Aracataca (colloquially sometimes referred to as "Cataca") is a municipality located in the Department of Magdalena, in Colombia's Caribbean Region. Aracataca is a river town founded in 1885. The town stands beside the river of the same name, the Aracataca river, that flows from the nearby Sierra Nevada de Santa Marta mountain range into the Ciénaga Grande de Santa Marta. The town is best known as the birthplace of Nobel literature laureate Gabriel García Márquez.

Geography and climate
The municipality borders to the north with the municipalities of Zona Bananera, Santa Marta and Cienaga, to the east with the Cesar Department, to the south with the municipality of Fundación, and to the west with the municipalities of El Retén and Pueblo Viejo.

Aracataca's climate is tropical: warm and humid year-round.

History
Aracataca was founded in 1885. It achieved the status of municipality on 28 April 1915, when it separated from the municipality of Pueblo Viejo. In the late 19th century, companies that would later merge into the United Fruit Company colonized the land and started to cultivate bananas in the wide region. After some decades, the downfall of the company initiated and completed soon after, partly because of the worldwide recession and the war soon after.

On June 25, 2006, a referendum to rename the town "Aracataca-Macondo" failed due to a low turnout.

Politics

Administrative divisions

Rural

Corregimientos
 Buenos Aires
 Cauca
 Sampues
 La Fuente

Veredas
Aracataca contains 13 veredas:
 Tehobromina
 El Torito
 Macaraquilla
 La escondida
 Bocatoma
 La Ribiera
 La Fuente
 Cerro Azul
 El Volante
 El porvenir
 Marimonda

Caserios
Aracataca has 3 caseríos:
 Serankua
 Yechikin
 Dwanawimaku

Urban

Neighborhoods
The town of Aracataca has 33 Barrios: La Esperanza, La esmeralda, Zacapita, 2 de febrero, 20 de Julio, Ayacucho, Nariño, Loma Fresca, 7 de Agosto, El Carmen, Cataquita, Macondo, El Suiche, El Pradito, 11 de Noviembre, 7 de Abril, Ciudadela macondo, San José, Base, Marujita, Las delicias, Centro, Boston, El Porvenir, 1 de Mayo, Galán, San Martín, Bello Horizonte, Raíces, Macondo, Villa del Río I y II.

Economy
Aracataca relies heavily on agriculture, mainly producing Oil palm, rice, cotton, sugar cane, common bean, plantain, bananas, yuca, tomato and on livestock raising like cattle, equines, mules, donkeys, domesticated birds, goats and pigs. Commerce represents another form of income and is mostly done informally, especially along the main highway to Santa Marta where large lines of stands selling beach towels are placed.

Transportation
There are several companies that offer inter-municipal and inter-departmental transportation on medium-size buses, minivans and taxi cabs. Most tourists and locals use Berlinas del Fonce which has busses leaving the Santa Marta terminal every 30 minutes between 5am and 6pm. $9.000 p.p.
From the transportation office in Aracataca you can get almost everywhere using a ciclotaxi for just $1.000 p.p.
The rivers are not navigable and there are a few small rudimentary airfields used by small aircraft for agricultural fumigation. The municipality and town are crossed by the Highway 45 that extends from Santa Marta, crosses Aracataca, Fundación, El Copey, Bosconia, Curumani into the Cesar Department and turns south towards the Colombian Andean Region. The railway no longer works for public transportation, it is used almost exclusively to transport coal from the region of La Loma Calentura in the Cesar Department to the Port of Santa Marta.

Culture

Festivities
Aracatacans celebrate the Roman Catholic tradition of Three Kings on January 6 of every year, Carnivals and the Holy Week between February and March, a cultural week, The Festival of the Unedited Song (Festival de la Canción Inédita), The municipality's anniversary in April and the River Festival (Festival del Río).
The Fiestas Patronales which consist of large outdoor concerts and semi bullfights this year is being held from 15 July till the 24th.

Tourism
Tourism in Aracataca is growing, but still at a low level. The most famous attraction is the house in which Gabriel García Márquez grew up, now the Casa Museo (Museum House). Another museum, Casa del Telegrafista, is also popular. In addition, the recently renovated train station will serve as an exhibition hall for photographs by Leo Matiz, a native of Aracataca.

In popular culture
The town is the birthplace of Nobel Prize-winning author García Márquez and is widely recognized as the model for the mythical "Macondo", the central village in García Márquez's popular novel, One Hundred Years of Solitude. His childhood home, now the Casa Museo, and the church where he was baptised are both major tourist attractions.

Gallery

References

External links

 Alcaldia de Aracataca
 Tourist Informacion

Municipalities of Magdalena Department